Prouna(프라우나) is a South Korean company that produces fine ceramics.

Ceramics made by Prouna are used by the British royal family, the Qatari royal family, the United Arab Emirates royal family.

References

External links
Official Website

Companies of South Korea
Ceramics manufacturers
Porcelain
South Korean brands